The St. Edward's Hilltoppers are the athletic teams that represent St. Edward's University, located in Austin, Texas, in NCAA Division II intercollegiate sporting competitions. The Hilltoppers compete as members of the Lone Star Conference for all 13 varsity sports. St. Edward's was a member of the Heartland Conference from 1999 to 2019.

History
As of Fall 2014, the Hilltopper varsity athletic teams made 29 NCAA Tournament appearances over the last five seasons. Since joining the NCAA in 1999, the Hilltopper teams have won 55 Heartland Conference Championships. In 2008–2009, five St. Edward's athletes were named All-American, and 56 individuals were named to the All-Heartland Conference Team.
St. Edward's men's soccer team was the Heartland Conference Champions in 2009. The women's soccer team has been very successful since 2006, posting winning records each season, and being selected to the NCAA Tournament 6 out of 7 years.

The university's official spirit group is the HillRaisers. The university's student-athlete graduation rate of 88% is fourth highest in the nation out of 270 Division II institutions.
The Dallas Cowboys football team used the campus for pre-season training from 1990 to 1997.

Early history
In late 1926, St. Edward's joined the Texas Conference, where they competed until late 1939, when the university discontinued intercollegiate athletics. During the pre-World War II era, St. Edward's teams had at least three different nicknames: Saints, Tigers, and Crusaders.

Present era
In April 2020, St. Edward's abruptly discontinued five NCAA Division II programs: men’s and women’s golf, men’s and women’s tennis and men’s soccer, while also downgrading its cheer squad to a club sport.

Varsity teams

List of teams

Men's sports (3)
Baseball
Basketball
Cross country

Women's sports (5)
Basketball
Cross country
Soccer 
Softball
Volleyball

Football
St. Edward's fielded an intercollegiate football team, last known as the Crusaders. The program was discontinued following the 1939 season.

Club sports and campus recreation
In 2009, the university added a Campus Recreation program to meet the growing needs of the student population. All club sports are housed within the Campus Recreation office. The university supports several club-level programs including:

Competitive club sports teams
 Cycling
 Men's Basketball
 Men's Lacrosse
 Men's Soccer
 Rugby
 Rowing
 Women's Soccer
 Swimming
 Women's Volleyball

Conditional club sports teams
 Archery
 Bass Fishing Club
 Cultural Dance Club
 Dance Team
 Karate
 Men's Volleyball
 Outdoor Adventure Club
 Ving Tsun Martial Arts Club
 Women's Basketball
 Women's Lacrosse

Intramural sports
 5-on-5 Basketball
 7-on-7 Soccer
 Dodgeball
 Flag football
 Indoor Soccer
 Indoor Volleyball
 Innertube Water Polo
 Racquetball
 Ultimate Frisbee
 Volleyball

Rugby club
Founded in 2009, the St Edward’s University Rugby Football Club plays in NSCRO or National Small College Rugby Organization in the Lonestar Conference. St. Edward's joined the Lonestar Conference in May 2013. St. Edward's ascended from Division III to Division I being promoted to the next division in three straight seasons from 2011-2013. In 2010-2011, their first season, St. Edwards had an undefeated regular season, won the Texas DIII league, and finished fifth nationally among small schools. In 2011-2012, St. Edwards again had an undefeated regular season in DII winning their conference. 2012-2013 saw St. Edward's join the DI South West Conference where they finished as the runner up in both 15's and 7's rugby. St. Edward's then rejoined the NSCRO Lone Star conference and finished with consecutive undefeated conference records and conference championships in 2013-2014 and 2014-2015. In 2014 St. Edward's won the inaugural Texas Cup competition which is an open tournament across all divisions and brackets in Texas college rugby, they also became the first team in the history of NSCRO to defeat a Varsity Cup team when they defeated the University of Texas. In 2015 St. Edwards was named men's college rugby program of the year. St. Edward's has seen an increase in applications and matriculating students who target the school because of its rugby program, and as a result, the administration has put more support behind the rugby program.

References

External links